Lawrence Inglee (born October 20, 1973) is an American film producer. Inglee most recently served as President of Production for Mosaic Film. He has worked as a producer on a number of films, including The Messenger by director Oren Moverman and The Day After Tomorrow by director Roland Emmerich.

Life and career
Inglee was born in Vermont. He holds a Bachelor's Degree from the Newhouse School of Communication at Syracuse University and began his career in entertainment with a position at Imagine Entertainment before joining The Mark Gordon Company.

He spent eight years with The Mark Gordon Company, eventually becoming head of production. While there, he oversaw numerous projects, including The Day After Tomorrow, Winter Passing and the 2009 film The Messenger, directed by Oren Moverman and starring Woody Harrelson, Ben Foster and Samantha Morton, and "Source Code" (2011).
Inglee then went on to become President of Production at Mosaic Film.

In September 2008, Inglee became President of production company Lightstream Pictures, to oversee all production and development efforts. In 2009 Lightstream announced two projects that will be produced by Inglee; Max Rose, starring Jerry Lewis and written and directed by Daniel Noah, and The Lost: A Search for Six of Six Million, an adaptation of the best-selling memoir of the same name by Daniel Mendelsohn, to be directed by famed French director Jean-Luc Godard.

In 2011, Inglee produced Rampart, Lightstream Pictures' first feature film, reuniting director Oren Moverman and stars Woody Harrelson and Ben Foster. The critically acclaimed film was co-written by James Ellroy and also stars Robin Wright, Brie Larson, Sigourney Weaver, Anne Heche, Cynthia Nixon, Ice Cube, Ned Beatty, and Steve Buscemi.

Variety recently named Inglee as one of the "10 Producers To Watch".

Inglee will serve as Producer of the Oren Moverman directed "Time Out of Mind," starring Richard Gere.

Filmography
Associate producer
 The Day After Tomorrow (2004)
 Winter Passing (2005)

Producer
 The Messenger (2009)
 Rampart (2011)
 Max Rose (2012) 
 Time Out of Mind (2014)
 Norman: The Moderate Rise and Tragic Fall of a New York Fixer (2015)
 Swiss Army Man (2016)
 Junction 48 (2016)
 2.22 (2017)
 The Ticket (2017)
 The Dinner (2017)
 The Tale (2018)
 Lost Girls & Love Hotels (2020)

Recognition

Awards and nominations
 2009, Won AFI Film Award for 'Film of the Year' for The Messenger
 2010, nominated for Independent Spirit Award for 'Best First Feature' for The Messenger

References

 https://web.archive.org/web/20090520144756/http://www.hollywoodreporter.com/hr/content_display/film/news/e3id53e7ac87972131ee9d83841ca62ba68

External links
 

Film producers from New York (state)
Living people
1973 births
People from Vermont
Syracuse University alumni